Kim Rasmussen (born 22 September 1972) is a Danish handball coach.

Career
In 2010, Rasmussen took over Poland Women's national team, which he coached until 2016 and led into two semi-final finishes at the World Championships of 2013 and 2015. 

In 2015, he took charge of the Romanian top division champions, CSM Bucharest and led them into winning the 2016 EHF Champions League in the final against Győr, as well as one Romanian Championship and one Romanian Cup.

Honours

As manager
EHF Champions League:
Winner: 2016
Romanian Championship:
Winner: 2016
Cupa României:
Winner: 2016

References

Living people
Danish handball coaches
1972 births
Danish expatriate sportspeople in Hungary
Danish expatriate sportspeople in Poland
Danish expatriate sportspeople in Romania
Handball coaches of international teams